Northern Anatolia was struck by a large earthquake on 17 August 1668 in the late morning. It had an estimated magnitude in the range 7.8–8.0  and the maximum felt intensity was IX on the Modified Mercalli intensity scale. The epicenter of the earthquake was on the southern shore of Ladik Lake.  It caused widespread damage from as far west as Bolu and as far east as Erzincan, resulting in about 8,000 deaths. It remains the most powerful earthquake recorded in Turkey.

Tectonic setting
North Anatolia lies across the mainly transform boundary between the Anatolian Plate and the Eurasian Plate. Relative to the Eurasian Plate the Anatolian Plate is being forced westwards by the continuing northward movement of the Arabian Plate. This motion is accommodated by a major dextral (right lateral) strike-slip fault system, the North Anatolian Fault. In detail the fault is formed of many separate segments. Movement on parts of this fault zone have been responsible for many large and damaging earthquakes. They tend to form overall westward propagating sequences that can last for many decades. The most recent sequence began with the 1939 Erzincan earthquake, continuing with major earthquakes in 1942, 1943, 1944, 1949, 1951, 1957, 1966, 1967, 1992 and two in 1999.

Earthquake
Analysis of historical records suggests that the 17 August earthquake was preceded by a number of foreshocks at the western end of the rupture zone. The mainshock was very large, with an estimated magnitude ranging from 7.8  (based on the size of the area affected by shaking of intensity VI) to 8.0  (based on the interpreted rupture length). In Tokat the earthquake was followed by at least six months of aftershocks.

Evidence of a major earthquake at about this time affecting the full  has been found by trenching across the fault at many localities.

The 1668 earthquake is regarded as probably the first in a mainly westward propagating sequence that continued into the 19th century, including events in 1719, 1754, 1766, 1859 and 1893.

Damage
The town of Bolu was reported to be almost completely destroyed by the earthquake, with 1,800 fatalities. There was also severe damage further east along the fault, with another 6,000 reported casualties between Merzifon and Niksar. Some damage was also reported from as far east as Erzincan and at various locations along the Black Sea coast. The walls and towers of Samsun Castle were damaged and some parts of the structure "were demolished".

References

1668 in the Ottoman Empire
Earthquakes in Turkey
1668 earthquakes
History of Samsun Province
History of Bolu Province
History of Erzincan Province
Bolu
History of Amasya Province
History of Tokat Province